Progeny Linux Systems was a company which provided Linux platform technology. Their Platform Services technology supported both Debian and RPM-based distributions for Linux platforms. Progeny Linux Systems was based in Indianapolis. Ian Murdock, the founder of Debian, was the founder and chairman of the board. Its CTO was John H. Hartman, and Bruce Byfield was marketing and communications director.

Progeny created an operating system called Progeny Componentized Linux.
Progeny eventually announced via a post to their mailing lists on 1 May 2007 that they were ceasing operations.


Progeny Componentized Linux 

Progeny Componentized Linux, usually called Progeny Debian, is a defunct free operating system. Progeny announced in a post to its various mailing lists on 1 May 2007 that they were ceasing operations, and shut down their website.

Progeny Debian was an alternative to Debian 3.1. Furthermore, it was based upon the Linux Standard Base (LSB) 3.0, adopting technology such as the Anaconda installer ported from Red Hat, Advanced Packaging Tool, and Discover. Progeny Debian aimed to be a model for developing a component-based Linux.

See also
Corel Linux

References

External links
Archive of progenylinux.com

Linux companies